Tropidophorus guangxiensis  is a species of skink. It is endemic to southern China and is found in Guangxi and Hunan provinces.

References

guangxiensis
Reptiles of China
Endemic fauna of China
Reptiles described in 1992